Saint Didier or Saint-Didier may refer to:

People
 Didier of Cahors (c. 580-655), Merovingian royal official
 Didier of Vienne (died 607), archbishop of Vienne and chronicler
 Didier of Rennes (died c. 672), bishop
 Deodatus of Nevers (died 679), bishop of Nevers

Places 

Saint-Didier, Côte-d'Or, in the Côte-d'Or  département
Saint-Didier, Ille-et-Vilaine, in the Ille-et-Vilaine  département 
Saint-Didier, Jura, in the Jura département
Saint-Didier, Nièvre, in the Nièvre  département 
Saint-Didier, Vaucluse, in the Vaucluse  département
Saint-Didier-au-Mont-d'Or, in the Rhône département 
Saint-Didier-d'Allier, in the Haute-Loire  département 
Saint-Didier-d'Aussiat, in the Ain  département
Saint-Didier-de-Bizonnes, in the Isère  département
Saint-Didier-de-Formans, in the Ain  département
Saint-Didier-de-la-Tour, in the Isère  département 
Saint-Didier-des-Bois, in the Eure  département 
Saint-Didier-en-Bresse, in the Saône-et-Loire  département 
Saint-Didier-en-Brionnais, in the Saône-et-Loire  département 
Saint-Didier-en-Donjon, in the Allier  département 
Saint-Didier-en-Velay, in the Haute-Loire  département
Saint-Didier-la-Forêt, in the Allier  département 
Saint-Didier-sous-Aubenas, in the Ardèche  département
Saint-Didier-sous-Écouves, in the Orne  département 
Saint-Didier-sous-Riverie, in the Rhône département
Saint-Didier-sur-Arroux, in the Saône-et-Loire département 
Saint-Didier-sur-Beaujeu, in the Rhône département 
Saint-Didier-sur-Chalaronne, in the Ain  département 
Saint-Didier-sur-Doulon, in the Haute-Loire  département
Saint-Didier-sur-Rochefort, in the Loire  département

See also 
 Didier (disambiguation)